Night Beat is an album by saxophonist Hank Crawford recorded in 1988 and released on the Milestone label the following year.

Reception 

Allmusic's Scott Yanow called it an: "accessible and enjoyable soul-jazz outing".

Track listing
All compositions by Hank Crawford except where noted
 "For the Love of You" (The Isley Brothers) – 8:07
 "Mobile Bay" (Mac Rebennack) – 5:01
 "Midnight Fantasy" – 6:55
 "K.C. Blues" (Charlie Parker) – 5:30
 "What a Wonderful World" (George Douglas, George David Weiss) – 5:30
 "Sleepin' on the Sidewalk" – 4:57
 "Trouble in Mind" (Richard M. Jones) – 4:19

Personnel
Hank Crawford  – alto saxophone, electric piano, arranger
Alan Rubin, Lew Soloff – trumpet
David "Fathead" Newman – tenor saxophone, flute
Howard Johnson – baritone saxophone
Dr. John – piano, organ
Melvin Sparks – guitar
Wilbur Bascomb - bass
Bernard Purdie − drums, percussion

References

Milestone Records albums
Hank Crawford albums
1989 albums
Albums produced by Bob Porter (record producer)
Albums recorded at Van Gelder Studio